The Kentucky State Treasurer is elected every four years along with the governor and other statewide officials. The treasurer, who can serve two terms, acts as the state's chief elected fiscal officer. The salary is $110,000 a year. 

The current treasurer, Allison Ball of Prestonsburg, Kentucky, is the first Republican elected to the post since 1944. She succeeded the term-limited Democrat Todd Hollenbach of Louisville, who instead became the 30th District Court judge.

The treasurer's duties include:
 Act as head of the treasury KRS 041.020
 Create and manage the state's depository KRS 041-070
 Make record of all monies due and payable to the state KRS 041-100
 Process warrants from the Finance and Administration Cabinet KRS 041-150
 Make payments on behalf of the state KRS 041-160
 Make an annual report KRS 041-340

List of Kentucky State Treasurers

References

External links